Sophie Kleeberg (born 30 May 1990) is a German shot putter.

Achievements

References

1990 births
Living people
German female shot putters
Universiade medalists in athletics (track and field)
Universiade silver medalists for Germany
Competitors at the 2013 Summer Universiade
Medalists at the 2011 Summer Universiade
21st-century German women